Humphreys County is the name of two counties in the United States:

Humphreys County, Mississippi 
Humphreys County, Tennessee